Calling All Stars may refer to:

Calling All Stars (1934 musical), a 1934 Broadway musical
Calling All Stars (1937 musical), a 1937 British musical film